is a junction railway station in the city of Ichinoseki, Iwate, Japan, operated by East Japan Railway Company (JR East).

Lines
Ichinoseki Station is served by the Tōhoku Shinkansen, Tōhoku Main Line and is a terminal station for the Ōfunato Line.

Station layout
The station has a single side platform and an island platform serving the Tōhoku Main Line and Ōfunato Line, and a pair of elevated opposed side platforms for the Tōhoku Shinkansen. The station has a Midori no Madoguchi staffed ticket office.

Platforms

History
Ichinoseki Station opened on April 16, 1890 on what is now the Tōhoku Main Line. Service on the Ōfunato Line started from July 26, 1925, and on the Tōhoku Shinkansen from June 23, 1982. The station was absorbed into the JR East network upon the privatization of the Japanese National Railways (JNR) on April 1, 1987.

Passenger statistics
In fiscal 2018, the station was used by an average of 4,398 passengers daily (boarding passengers only).

Surrounding area
Ichinoseki City Hall
Ichinoseki Post Office

See also
 List of railway stations in Japan

References

External links

 

Railway stations in Iwate Prefecture
Tōhoku Shinkansen
Tōhoku Main Line
Ōfunato Line
Railway stations in Japan opened in 1890
Ichinoseki, Iwate